H is an S-train service in Metropolitan Copenhagen, Denmark that serves mainly the outer part of Frederikssundbanen, running partially non-stop between Ballerup and Flintholm. It is one of the six base lines of the S-train network, running every 20 minutes all days from about 5:00 until 1:00. It is the only base line in the network whose frequency is not doubled in the daytime; instead approximate 10-minute service on the outer part of the radial is provided by extending some trains on service C from Ballerup to Frederikssund. On Friday and Saturday nights there is also a 30 minutes service throughout the night.

Stations
Frederikssund Originally opened on June 17.th 1879, changed to S-train on May 28.th, 1989
Ølstykke Originally opened on June 17.th 1879, changed to S-train on May 28.th, 1989
Gl. Toftegård opened September 15.th, 2002
Stenløse Originally opened on February 18.th 1882, changed to S-train on May 28.th, 1989
Veksø Originally opened on June 17.th 1879, changed to S-train on May 28.th, 1989
 (skipping Kildedal)
Måløv Originally opened on June 17.th 1879, changed to S-train on May 28.th, 1989
Ballerup Originally opened on June 17.th 1879, changed to S-train May 15.th, 1949
Malmparken Opened May 27.th 1989
 (skipping Skovlunde)
Herlev Originally opened on June 17.th 1879, changed to S-train May 15.th, 1949
Husum
 (skipping Islev, Jyllingevej)
Vanløse Originally opened on June 17 th. 1879, rebuilt and opened September 23.rd, 1941
Flintholm opened January 24, 2004
 (skipping Peter Bangsvej, Langgade)
Valby Opened November 1, 1934
Carlsberg Opened July 3, 2016
Dybbølsbro  Opened November 1, 1934
København H opened May 15, 1934
Vesterport opened May 15, 1934
Nørreport opened May 15, 1934
Østerport opened May 15, 1934
Following stations are not part of this line since 2017, before that serviced only during rush hour. They are serviced by line B.
Nordhavn
Svanemøllen
Ryparken
 (skipping Emdrup, Dyssegård)
Vangede
 (skipping Kildebakke)
Buddinge
Stengården
Bagsværd
 (skipping Skovbrynet)
Hareskov
Værløse
Farum

History
H as a service letter was first used in 1972 for a service that was designed to be extended to Hareskovbanen, which is probably the reason why this letter was chosen. The service letter disappeared in the 1979 timetable, but was reinvented in 1989.

A limited-stop daytime line called H+ ran from 1993 to 2007, initially superseding rush-hour services Cx and Bx on the Ballerup and Farum radials:

References

S-train (Copenhagen)